A voiced postalveolar fricative is a type of consonantal sound used in some spoken languages. The International Phonetic Association uses the term voiced postalveolar fricative only for the sound , but it also describes the voiced postalveolar non-sibilant fricative , for which there are significant perceptual differences.

Voiced palato-alveolar fricative

The voiced palato-alveolar fricative or voiced domed postalveolar fricative is a type of consonantal sound, used in some spoken languages.

Transcription
In some transcriptions of alphabets such as the Cyrillic, the sound is represented by the digraph . 

The sound occurs in many languages and, as in English and French, may have simultaneous lip rounding, although this is rarely indicated in transcription.

Features
Features of the voiced palato-alveolar fricative:

Occurrence

Voiced postalveolar non-sibilant fricative

The voiced postalveolar non-sibilant fricative is a consonantal sound. As the International Phonetic Alphabet does not have separate symbols for the post-alveolar consonants (the same symbol is used for all coronal places of articulation that aren't palatalized), this sound is usually transcribed  (retracted constricted ). The equivalent X-SAMPA symbol is r\_-_r.

Features
 However, it does not have the grooved tongue and directed airflow, or the high frequencies, of a sibilant.
 Its place of articulation is postalveolar, which means it is articulated with either the tip or the blade of the tongue behind the alveolar ridge.

Occurrence

See also
 Ezh
Voiceless postalveolar fricative
 Index of phonetics articles

Notes

References

External links
 

Postalveolar consonants
Fricative consonants
Pulmonic consonants
Voiced oral consonants
Central consonants
Labial–coronal consonants